is a Japanese actor and model. He is part of Evergreen Entertainment and has appeared several times in Japanese movies and TV dramas. He received a Junon Super Boy Photogenic Award.

Filmography

TV dramas 
 Challenged (2010) as Genki Ito
 Dohyo Girl (2010) as Shigeo Ikebe
 Challenged - Graduation (TV Movies) (2011) as Genki Ito
 High School Restaurant (2011) as Shota Tamura (Second Year Student)
 Ouran High School Host Club (2011) as Arai
 Kamen Rider Fourze (2011) as Soushi Matoyama (Perseus Zodiarts)

Movies 
 Bokutachi no Play Ball (2010) as Koichi
 Kamen Rider Fourze the Movie: Space, Here We Come! (2012) as Soushi Matoyama (Perseus Zodiarts)

Theatrical and other performances
 Junon Super Boy Contest Vol.21 Ryutaro Akimoto (2009)
 Amadanshi - Amadan (2011)
 Evergreen Entertainment Show 2011 Vol.2 (2011)

Awards and nominations
 Junon Super Boy contest - Photogenic Award (2009)

References

External links
 Official website 

1995 births
Japanese male television actors
Living people
People from Tokyo